Cadbury Ireland is a confectionery company in Ireland based in Coolock in Dublin. It is a subsidiary of Cadbury, currently owned by Mondelēz International. Cadbury Ireland exports over 200 of its products to 30 countries worldwide, making a contribution of €110 million of Irish trade. Cadbury Ireland uses local ingredients.

The company operates two factories in Ireland in Coolock in Dublin (where the headquarters of Cadbury Ireland are located) and in Rathmore in Kerry.

History  
The company was established in 1824 in Birmingham by John Cadbury. Cadbury Ireland built its first Irish factory at Ossory Road, Dublin in 1933, at the time, the company manufactured and sold just three products. It later moved to its current site in Coolock in 1964. In 1948 the company built it’s chocolate crumb factory in Rathmore, Co. Kerry, about 20 miles from Killarney.

In February 2015, the company announced it was closing its Tallaght plant and moving some of its production from Coolock to Poland, resulting in the loss of about 200 jobs.

Products

Dairy Milk
Creme Egg
Moro
Boost
Wispa
Flake
Crunchie
Starbar

See also
 Cadbury
 Cadbury World
 Cadbury's Claremont
 History of Cadbury

References

External links
 

Food and drink companies of Ireland
Ireland